The second season of the serial crime-thriller television series Millennium commenced airing in the United States on September 19, 1997, concluding on May 15, 1998 after airing twenty-three episodes. It tells the story of retired FBI Agent Frank Black (Lance Henriksen). Black lives in Seattle, Washington with his wife Catherine (Megan Gallagher) and daughter Jordan (Brittany Tiplady). He works for a mysterious organization known as the Millennium Group, investigating murders using his remarkable capability of relating to the monsters responsible for horrific crimes. After killing a man who stalked and kidnapped Catherine, Black faces tension within his family while simultaneously being drawn deeper into the sinister Group.

The season began with "The Beginning and the End", which marked the first episode of the series helmed by new co-executive producers Glen Morgan and James Wong, who would remain in charge for the full season. Accolades earned by the season include a Bram Stoker Award nomination for Darin Morgan's "Somehow, Satan Got Behind Me", a Primetime Emmy Award nomination for "Jose Chung's Doomsday Defense" guest star Charles Nelson Reilly and a Young Artist Award win for Tiplady.

Production 

The second season saw series creator Chris Carter step down as executive producer, being replaced by the team of Glen Morgan and James Wong. Morgan and Wong had previously written episodes for the series in its first season, and had worked with Carter on his first television series The X-Files. Morgan and Wong left similar positions on The X-Files to take up the Millennium roles, with Fox president Sandy Grushow saying that "with Chris writing and producing X-Files fifth season, as well as the feature film, it was critical that we identify exec producers who could enable Millennium to grow".

Discussing plans for the season, Morgan noted that "the Millennium Group is a much deeper organization" than seen in the first season, adding that "they're considering [Frank Black] for a candidate for the group (and) trying to show him that at the millennium there's going to be an event - either fire and brimstone or harmonic convergence". Wong spoke about how the character of Catherine Black changed, saying "there's a different relationship between Frank and his family this season because of the separation ... I think that will not only bring some kind of heartfelt drama but humor into it". Wong also stated "we don't want to have the audience expect to see a serial killer every week. ... We would like to make it so that it's a surprise to them, just like it is a surprise when you watch The X-Files".

Producer John Peter Kousakis has noted that the first and second seasons, and the third season after those, were markedly different, crediting each season's differing approach to the changes in leadership behind the scenes; Kousakis felt that the character of Frank Black remained the main constant throughout the series. Fellow producer Ken Horton felt that the change in focus for season two arose as the first season's focus on serial killers had "overpowered" its storytelling, making it necessary to focus attention elsewhere instead; the focus switched from external forces and villains to the internal workings of the Millennium Group. The series' musical supervisor Mark Snow found that Morgan and Wong brought another new element to the series—the music of Bobby Darin, which has been a hallmark of the duo's work. Darin's music accompanied Snow's scores in a number of episodes, often as diegetic music being listened to by Lance Henriksen's character. Snow believed this gave the character a down-to-earth, everyman feel.

Cast

Starring
 Lance Henriksen as Frank Black
 Megan Gallagher as Catherine Black

Recurring cast

Also starring
 Brittany Tiplady as Jordan Black

Guest starring
 Terry O'Quinn as Peter Watts
 Peter Outerbridge as Barry Baldwin
Stephen E. Miller as Andy McClaren

Reception

Accolades 

The second season earned several awards and nominations for those associated with the series. Tiplady and "Monster" guest star Lauren Diewold earned nominations at the 1998 Young Artist Awards, with Tiplady winning in the category Best Performance in a TV Comedy/Drama – Supporting Young Actress Age Ten or Under. Henriksen earned a Golden Globe Award nomination for Best Actor in a Television Series Drama, losing out to Anthony Edwards as ER Mark Greene At the Primetime Emmy Awards, the series earned two nomination. Charles Nelson Reilly earned an acting nod for his guest role in "Jose Chung's Doomsday Defense", losing out to The Practice John Larroquette. Millennium also earned a nomination for Outstanding Sound Editing for a Series, losing the award to ER. The season also produced a Bram Stoker Award nomination in 1999, for Darin Morgan's episode "Somehow, Satan Got Behind Me"; the award was won jointly by Bill Condon for Gods and Monsters and Alex Proyas, David S. Goyer and Lem Dobbs for Dark City.

Critical reception 

Writing for Slant magazine, Keith Uhlich gave the season an overall rating of three-and-a-half stars out of five, finding that the appointment of Morgan and Wong was "an inspired choice that led to, arguably, the finest episodic run ever produced under [series creator Chris] Carter's Ten-Thirteen Productions banner". Uhlich found that the season was torn between episodes remaining true to the Carter-led first season's "serial killer of the week" format and make-it-up-as-you-go-along approach to storytelling", and Morgan and Wong's attempt to introduce a continuous story arc which lent a "sealed-off feel" to the season, finding that the latter approach lead to a "compulsively watchable" but largely dated end result. DVD Talk's Bill Gibron rated the season overall four-and-a-half stars out of five, finding that the new thematic direction was "right on the money". Gibron felt that the season "was truly ahead of its time. It predates and predicts such fashionable fads as The Da Vinci Code, the omens of terrorist evil and the slow erosion of the citizenry's faith in the Federal Government". Emily VanDerWerff, writing for The A.V. Club, wrote that "the second season of Millennium is some sort of work of weird genius". VanDerWerff added that the season "moves like a series with a new purpose, with a new sense of meaning. Morgan and Wong start tossing ideas at the wall with a thrilling abandon, almost as if they were pretty sure they’d never work in Hollywood again". 

Robert Shearman and Lars Pearson, in their book Wanting to Believe: A Critical Guide to The X-Files, Millennium & The Lone Gunmen, rated several episodes across the season highly, awarding five stars out of five to "The Curse of Frank Black", "Jose Chung's Doomsday Defense", "Midnight of the Century", "A Room with No View", "The Fourth Horseman" and "The Time Is Now". However, several episodes rated poorly, with "Beware of the Dog", "A Single Blade of Grass", "The Hand of St. Sebastian", "Roosters", "In Arcadia Ego" and "Anamnesis" being seen as particularly poor. In all, Shearman singled out the season's climactic two-part episodes "The Fourth Horseman" and "The Time Is Now" as the highlight of the season, finding that Morgan and Wong took a considerable risk with the storyline as they believed the series would be cancelled at the end of the season, but believing that the episodes gained from this additional level of attempted closure.

Episodes

Notes

Footnotes

References

External links

 
 

1997 American television seasons
1998 American television seasons